The following is a timeline of the history of the city of São Paulo, Brazil.

Prior to 20th century

 1554 – Jesuit Pátio do Colégio founded in São Paulo dos Campos de Piratininga.
 1560 – Municipal Chamber of São Paulo founded.
 1681 – Seat of Portuguese colonial Captaincy of São Vicente relocated to São Paulo from São Vicente.
 1720 – São Paulo becomes capital of Captaincy of São Paulo.
 1745 – Catholic Diocese of São Paulo established.
 1822 – São Paulo becomes part of the Empire of Brazil.
 1827 – Faculdade de Direito do Largo de São Francisco, oldest Law School in Brazil, founded.
 1831 – São Paulo Municipal Imperial Guard established.
 1836 – Irmandade da Nossa Senhora dos Remedios (religious society) founded.
 1854 –  newspaper begins publication.
 1858 – Cemitério da Consolação established.
 1867 – São Paulo Railway begins operating.
 1871 – American School founded.
 1872 - Population: 31,385.
 1875 – Provincia de S. Paulo newspaper begins publication.
 1878 – German school founded.
 1884 –  newspaper begins publication.
 1890
 São Paulo Stock Exchange founded.
 O Estado de S. Paulo newspaper in publication.
 Population: 64,934.
 1891 – Paulista Avenue inaugurated.
 1893
 Polytechnic School founded.
 Population: 130,775.
 1894 -  founded.
 1895 – Capela de Santa Cruz (church) built.
 1897 – Paróquia São José do Belém (church) established.
 1899 – Antônio da Silva Prado becomes first mayor.
 1900
 Municipal Works Department created.
 Population: 239,620.
  photo studio in business.

20th century

1900s-1950s

 1901 – Luz Station built.
 1905 –  founded.
 1906
 Conservatório Dramático e Musical de São Paulo founded.
  (church) built.
 1910 – Sport Club Corinthians Paulista formed.
 1911 – Municipal Theatre opens.
 1914 – Palestra Italia football club formed.
 1915 – City zones created (central, urban, suburban, rural).
 1916 –  opens.
 1917 – Labor strike.
 1919 – Nacional Atlético Clube (football team) and Japan Club established.
 1920
 Carandiru Penitentiary built.
 Population: 579,033.
 1922
 Brooklin Novo neighborhood established.
 Modern Art Week occurs.
 1924 – Paulista Revolt of 1924.
 1926 – Monument to the Independence of Brazil erected.
 1928 –  (residence) built.
 1929 –  built.
 1930
 São Paulo Futebol Clube formed.
 Avenues Plan (urban plan) presented.
 1932 – 9 July: São Paulo Constitutional Revolution begins.
 1933 – Mercado Municipal Paulistano built.
 1934
 University of São Paulo established.
 Marco Zero milestone installed in Praça da Sé.
 Colégio Bandeirantes de São Paulo (school) opens.
 1936 – São Paulo–Congonhas Airport opens.
 1938
 Estádio Nicolau Alayon (stadium) opens.
 Francisco Prestes Maia becomes mayor.
 1939 – Paróquia Nossa Senhora de Lourdes (church) established.
 1940
 Japanese Chamber of Commerce established.
 Population: 1,326,261.
 1941 – Paulista Equestrian Society established.
 1943 –  opens.
 1947
 Rodovia Anchieta (highway) and São Paulo Museum of Art open.
 Altino Arantes Building constructed.
 1949 – Cemitério de Vila Formosa and Companhia Cinematográfica Vera Cruz established.
 1950 
 TV Tupi begins television broadcasting.
 Population: 2,017,025.
 1951 – São Paulo Art Biennial begins.
 1954
 São Paulo Cathedral consecrated.
 Ibirapuera Park and Orquestra Sinfônica do Estado de São Paulo (symphony) established.
 1955 – Obelisk of São Paulo inaugurated.
 1958 – São Paulo Zoo opens near city.

1960s-1990s

 1960
 Mirante do Vale built.
 Population: 2,781,446.
 Folha de S. Paulo newspaper in publication.
 Favela  diary of Carolina Maria de Jesus published.
 1963
 1963 Pan American Games held in São Paulo.
 Notícias Populares newspaper begins publication.
 Museum of Contemporary Art, University of São Paulo established.
 1965 – Edifício Itália built.
 1966
 Gazeta cinema opens.
 Iguatemi Faria Lima shopping mall in business on Brigadeiro Faria Lima Avenue.
 Jornal da Tarde newspaper begins publication.
 1967 – Exame magazine headquartered in city.
 1968
 Plan for Integrated Development of São Paulo presented.
 Veja magazine headquartered in city.
 1969 – Palácio Anchieta (city hall) inaugurated.
 1970
 Marginal Pinheiros (highway) opens.
 Centro Cultural da Penha and Minhocão elevated highway built.
 São Paulo Museum of Image and Sound established.
 Convention Center opens in Santana.
 Population: 5,186,752 city; 5,869,966 urban agglomeration.
 1971 – Hilton hotel in business.
 1974
 Line 1 (São Paulo Metro) begins operating.
 Rodovia dos Imigrantes (highway) opens.
 Paróquia Nossa Senhora do Bom Conselho (church) built.
 Japanese archway erected in Liberdade.
 1976 – Colégio Vértice (school) founded.
 1977
 São Paulo International Film Festival begins.
 Jabaquara Intermunicipal Terminal opens.
 1979
 Line 3 (São Paulo Metro) begins operating.
 Teatro Lira Paulistana inaugurated.
 Bandeirantes landfill opens near city.
 1980
 Workers' Party headquartered in São Paulo.
 Population: 8,493,226.
 1982 – Tietê Bus Terminal opens.
 1983 – April: Economic unrest.
 1985 – Delegacias de Defense da Mulher (women's police station) established.
 1987 – Braudel Institute of World Economics and Instituto Itaú Cultural established.
 1989 – Latin America Memorial complex inaugurated.
 1990 – Center for Education and Development of Health Care Workers of São Paulo established.
 1991
 Line 2 (São Paulo Metro) begins operating.
 Anhembi Sambadrome opens.
 Population: 9,626,894.
 1992
 October: Carandiru prison riot and crackdown.
 São João landfill opens.
 Companhia Paulista de Trens Metropolitanos established.
 1993
  (publisher) established.
 Population: 9,842,059 (estimate).
 1995
 São Paulo Fashion Week begins.
 Plaza Centenário hi-rise built.
 1997
 São Paulo Gay Pride Parade begins.
 Celso Pitta becomes mayor.
 1999
 D.O.M. (restaurant) in business.
 Credicard Hall and Sala São Paulo (concert hall) open.
 2000
 Torre Norte built.
 Mayor Celso Pitta ousted, then reinstated.

21st century

2000s
 2002
 Line 5 (São Paulo Metro) begins operating.
 Casa das Áfricas founded.
 2003 – Lapa Terminal opens.
 2005 – E-Tower and Ibirapuera Auditorium built.
 2006
 May 2006 São Paulo violence.
 Gilberto Kassab becomes mayor.
 2007
 Eldorado Business Tower built.
 Population: 10,886,518.
 25 March: Ocupa Mauá begins in the former Hotel Santos Dumont.
 2008
 Octávio Frias de Oliveira Bridge opens.
 Cidade Jardim shopping mall in business.
 Itaú Unibanco (bank) headquartered in city.
 2009 – November: Blackout.

2010s
 2010
 Line 4 (São Paulo Metro) begins operating.
  (bike path) opens.
 Trucks banned on Bandeirantes Avenue weekdays.
 Population: 11,253,503 city; 19,889,559 in Greater São Paulo.
 Area of city: 588 square miles.
 2011 – Hi-rise Edifício São Vito demolished.
 2012 – October:  held.
 2013
 Fernando Haddad becomes mayor.
 Company Business Towers built.
 Protests against bus fare rises begin in the city.
 2014
 Line 15 (São Paulo Metro) begins operating.
 Allianz Parque arena and Arena Corinthians open.
 Temple of Solomon replica built.
 2016 - 2 October: São Paulo mayoral election, 2016 held.
 2018 -  Edifício Wilton Paes de Almeida, an abandoned high-rise building home to squatters catches fire and collapses, killing at least one person.

See also
 São Paulo history
 
 List of mayors of São Paulo

Other cities in Brazil:
 Timeline of Brasília
 Timeline of Curitiba
 Timeline of Fortaleza
 Timeline of Manaus
 Timeline of Recife
 Timeline of Rio de Janeiro
 Timeline of Salvador, Bahia

References

This article incorporates information from the Portuguese Wikipedia.

Bibliography

Published in the 19th century
 
 
 
 
Published in the 20th century
 
 
 
 
 Richard M. Morse. From Community to Metropolis: A Biography of São Paulo, Brazil. (New York, 1974)
 
 Elizabeth Kuznesof. Household Economy and Urban Development, São Paulo, 1765 to 1836 (Boulder, CO: Westview, 1986)
 
 
 

Published in the 21st century
 
 
 
 
 
 
  (also many papers about São Paulo at same website)

External links
 
 Map of São Paulo, 1982
 Items related to São Paulo, various dates (via Digital Public Library of America)

Sao Paulo
São Paulo-related lists
sao paulo